Crozer Health is a four-hospital health system based in Delaware County, Pennsylvania, and serving Delaware County; northern Delaware and parts of western New Jersey.

History 
In 1893, the 48-bed Chester Hospital opened to serve the growing population of Chester, Pennsylvania. Ten years later, the J. Lewis Crozer Homeopathic Hospital opened nearby in Upland, Pennsylvania. In 1958, the J. Lewis Crozer Homeopathic Hospital was renamed Crozer Hospital and in 1963 merged with Chester Hospital to officially become the Crozer-Chester Medical Center.

Plans for a new hospital in Upper Darby, Pennsylvania, were drawn in 1925 and the Delaware County Hospital was chartered. It opened to the public on July 1, 1927, with 56 beds and 11 bassinets. The hospital was renamed Delaware County Memorial Hospital in 1959.

In 1970, the Crozer-Chester Medical Center expanded its campus by taking over the grounds of the Crozer Theological Seminary. This school originated as a Normal School, built by the textile manufacturer John Price Crozer and was used as an Army hospital during the American Civil War and as part of the Pennsylvania Military Academy

The Crozer Theological Seminary served as an American Baptist Church school and trained seminarians for entry into the Baptist ministry from 1869 to 1970.  Martin Luther King Jr. was a student at the school from 1948 to 1951 and graduated with a Bachelor of Divinity degree.  In 1970 the school moved to Rochester, New York, in a merger that formed the Colgate Rochester Crozer Divinity School.

Crozer-Chester Medical Center and Delaware County Memorial Hospital formally merged in 1990 to create Crozer-Keystone Health System, making it the largest provider of healthcare services in Delaware County, Pennsylvania. Springfield Hospital (est. 1960) joined the system later that year.

In 1992, the health system acquired Sacred Heart Medical Center (est. 1983) in Chester, Pennsylvania and renamed it Community Hospital.  Finally, Taylor Hospital (est. 1910) joined Crozer-Keystone Health System in 1997 as its newest member.

In November 2013, Crozer-Keystone Health System joined Noble Health Alliance. Abington Memorial Hospital, Aria Health, and Einstein Healthcare Network formed the alliance in July 2013. The initiative was intended to encourage collaboration between the four health systems in order to provide the Philadelphia and its suburbs with more comprehensive care. In April 2016, the board of managers of Noble Health Alliance announced its decision to dissolve the organization.

In January 2016, Crozer-Keystone entered into a definitive agreement for the health system to be acquired by Prospect Medical Holdings, Inc. On July 1, 2016, Prospect Medical Holdings, Inc. completed its acquisition of Crozer-Keystone Health System after receiving all necessary regulatory approval.

In September 2020, the system's name was changed from Crozer-Keystone Health System to Crozer Health.

The health system was placed under financial stress during the COVID-19 pandemic due to supply chain issues and rising costs, causing government spenders to account for 60% of the hospital's income. On February 11, 2022, Christiana Care Health System announced the intent to acquire Crozer Health from Prospect Medical Holdings; however, this was later revoked.

Hospitals and facilities 
Crozer Health comprises four hospitals and a network of outpatient centers. These facilities house a Level 2 trauma center, a regional burn center, three regional cancer centers, and a kidney transplant center.

Crozer-Chester Medical Center 

Crozer-Chester Medical Center (Crozer) is a 424-bed tertiary-care teaching hospital located on a 68-acre campus in Upland, Pennsylvania. A Level II trauma center, admits more than 19,000 patients, treats approximately 53,000 Emergency Department patients and delivers approximately 1,700 babies annually.  Also a world-class Nathan Speare Regional Burn Treatment Center, Kidney Transplant program, Bariatric Surgery Program, First Steps Rehab, and Global Neuroscience Institute unit.

Delaware County Memorial Hospital 
Delaware County Memorial Hospital is a 225-bed facility in Drexel Hill, Pennsylvania, that offers a broad range of acute and specialized services. The hospital admits over 10,000 patients, treats nearly 40,000 Emergency Department patients, completes more than 5,800 surgeries, and delivers more than 1,800 babies annually.

Springfield Hospital 
Springfield Hospital today is a 40-bed hospital in Springfield, Pennsylvania, that provides comprehensive acute-care services and wellness care. The hospital admits more than 1,800 patients and receives more than 11,000 Emergency Department visits annually.

Taylor Hospital 
Taylor Hospital is a 156-bed hospital in Ridley Park, Pennsylvania, that admits more than 7,000 patients and receives more than 28,000 Emergency Department visits.

Outpatient Centers 
 Crozer Brinton Lake
 Media Medical Plaza
 Crozer-Keystone at Broomall
 Crozer-Keystone Surgery Center at Brinton Lake
 Crozer-Keystone Surgery Center at Haverford
 Philadelphia CyberKnife

References

External links 

Chester, Pennsylvania
Healthcare in Pennsylvania
Hospital networks in the United States
Medical and health organizations based in Pennsylvania
Trauma centers